The year 703 BC was a year of the pre-Julian Roman calendar. In the Roman Empire, it was known as year 51 Ab urbe condita . The denomination 703 BC for this year has been used since the early medieval period, when the Anno Domini calendar era became the prevalent method in Europe for naming years.

Events

Births

Deaths
 Marduk-zakir-shumi II, king of Babylon in 703 BC

References

700s BC